Downham Market railway station is on the Fen line in the east of England, serving the town of Downham Market, Norfolk. Its three-letter station code is DOW.

The station and most trains calling are operated by Great Northern (with service to and from ), with some additional peak services being operated by Greater Anglia (to and from London Liverpool Street).

The station building of 1846, built of carrstone with pale brick dressings, is a Grade II listed building.

History

The Lynn & Ely Railway Act received the Royal Assent on 30 June 1845. Work started on the line in 1846 and the line and its stations were opened on 27 October 1846. Downham Station opened with the line and was situated south of Stow Station and was a temporary end of the line. The line was completed to Ely in  1847. On New Year's Day, Downham station ceased to be a temporary terminus when the line was opened through to Denver Road Gate.

The new line connected King's Lynn and its harbour with Ely and trains to London.

The wooden signal box, built for the Great Eastern Railway in 1881, was listed Grade II in 2013.

In early 2017, the station was redecorated to commemorate Network SouthEast, the British Rail division that operated services across England's south east 30 years previously. With assistance from the Railway Heritage Trust, paintwork and signage has been returned to a style that mimics that of the late 1980s.

Services
Great Northern operate all off-peak services at Downham Market using  EMUs.

The typical off-peak service in trains per hour is:
 1 tph to 
 1 tph to 

During the peak hours, additional Great Northern services run to the station as well as a single Greater Anglia service to and from London Liverpool Street.

Footbridge
On 10 August 2009 Network Rail submitted a planning application for a new £1.5 million footbridge, describing the current foot crossing as 'one of the most dangerous in the country'. The plan was supported by then station operator First Capital Connect, with an intended completion date of summer 2011. The initial application was withdrawn following consultation with local councils, English Heritage and the Railway Heritage Trust and a revised plan submitted in December 2009 following changes to improve the appearance of the bridge. However, this proposal was rejected by King's Lynn and West Norfolk Council in April 2010, citing the lack of accessibility for disabled passengers and the effect of the bridge on the Grade II listed station building.

The foot crossing has since been closed and passengers must now use the nearby road level crossing to switch between platforms.

References

External links 

Railway stations in Norfolk
DfT Category E stations
Former Great Eastern Railway stations
Railway stations in Great Britain opened in 1846
Railway stations served by Govia Thameslink Railway
Greater Anglia franchise railway stations
1846 establishments in England
Downham Market